The Commission for the Environment may refer to:

 New Zealand Commission for the Environment
 Central American Commission for the Environment and Development, a participating organization in the Global Earth Observation System of Systems
 National Commission for the Environment, see Sara Larraín

See also
 Commissioner for the Environment